Baby, Come Back is an album by British group The Equals, which was released in the U.S. by RCA Victor, who had obtained the rights to manufacture and distribute the album in all of the Americas from the band's British label, President Records.

The record contains tracks culled from their first three UK albums, Unequalled Equals (1967), Explosion (1968), and Sensational Equals (1968).   Two of the tracks were taken from Unequalled:  the UK chart-topping single "Baby, Come Back", and "Hold Me Closer".  Three tracks came from Explosion: "Police On My Back", "Teardrops", and "Leaving You Is Hard To Do".  The remaining six tracks came from the band's third British album, Sensational.<ref>[https://www.discogs.com/The-Equals-Baby-Come-Back/release/1492502  Baby, Come Back", Discogs.com]. Retrieved 12 March 2018</ref>

Because it was built around the group's biggest hit, "Baby, Come Back", this was the group's most commercially successful album in the U.S.  The album has never been available on CD.  The only other known alternate configuration for the album was as an 8-track tape cartridge – RCA catalog number P8S 1388.

Track listing

Side One

 "Baby, Come Back" (Eddy Grant)
 "Reincarnation" (Derv Gordon, Grant)
 "Police on My Back" (Grant)
 "Teardrops" (Grant, Derv Gordon, Lincoln Gordon)
 "The Guy Who Made Her a Star" (Tony Clarke)

Side Two

 "Laurel and Hardy" (Grant)
 "Soul Groovin'" (Grant)
 "Good Times Are Gone Forever" (Grant, Patrick Lloyd)
 "Leaving You Is Hard to Do" (Derv Gordon, Lincoln Gordon)
 "The Skies Above" (Grant)
 "Hold Me Closer" (Grant, Lincoln Gordon)

Personnel
The Equals
Eddy Grant - lead guitar, vocals
Derv Gordon - lead vocals
Lincoln Gordon - bass guitar, vocals
Patrick Lloyd - rhythm guitar
John Hall - drums

All song and personnel information gathered from the liner notes of the album Baby, Come Back (Copyright © 1968 by RCA Records)

Cover versions of songs
"Police on My Back" was covered by The Clash on the Sandinista! album, in 1980. The Clash version was sampled by Lethal Bizzle for his version of the song, which was released as a single and included on his 2007 album Back to Bizznizz. His version reached number 37 on the UK Singles Chart. Other covers of the song include a Spanish-language version recorded by Amparanoia titled "La semana", released on her debut album El Poder de Machin, and a version performed as a collaboration between Asian Dub Foundation and Zebda for the French TV programme Music Planet 2Nite in February 2003 which was included as a bonus track on ADF's 2003 album Enemy of the Enemy''.

"Baby, Come Back" was successfully covered by Pato Banton; his re-make of the song saw it top the UK Singles chart for a second time, in October 1994.

See also

Beat-Club

References

1968 albums
RCA Victor albums
The Equals albums